Accolade is a ceremony to confer knighthood.

Accolade may also refer to:
 Accolade (architecture) A sculptural embellishment of an arch
 Accolade (notation), a musical symbol
 Scholastic accolade
 Accolade (company), an American video game developer and publisher
 Accolade Holding, a Czech investment group
 Accolade (play), by Emlyn Williams
 Ulmus 'Morton', a hybrid elm cultivar sold using the trade name Accolade
 Curly braces {...}
 Operation Accolade war operation in Aegean Sea during World War II

See also 
 Accolate, also called zafirlukast, a chemical treatment for asthma
 The Accolade (disambiguation)